This is a list of named geological features on Enceladus. Geological features on Enceladus are named after people and places from Burton's translation of The Book of the Thousand Nights and a Night, also known as  The Tales of the Arabian Nights.

Planitiae
Enceladean plains are called planitiae. They are named after the locations of events in the Arabian Nights.

Dorsa
Enceladean ridges are called dorsa. They are named after the locations of events in the Arabian Nights.

Sulci
Sulci are long, parallel grooves. Enceladean sulci are named after the locations of events in the Arabian Nights.

Fossae
Fossae are ditches or trenches. Enceladean fossae are named after the locations of events in the Arabian Nights.

Rupes
On Enceladus, escarpments are called rupes.

Craters

Enceladean craters are named after characters in the Arabian Nights.

See also

List of quadrangles on Enceladus

External links
 USGS: Enceladus nomenclature
Labeled Enceladus Map

Enceladus